My Homies is the fifth studio album by the American rapper Scarface. The album was released March 3, 1998, by Rap-A-Lot Records and Virgin Records. The album features production by Mike Dean, Mr. Lee, N.O. Joe, Scarface and Tone Capone. It peaked at number 1 on the Billboard Top R&B/Hip-Hop Albums and at number 4 on the Billboard 200 and was certified Platinum by the RIAA on April 6, 1998. The album features guest performances by 2Pac, Master P,  Ice Cube, Devin the Dude, B-Legit, UGK, Too Short, Do or Die and Willie D. Scarface appears solo on two of thirty songs, performs with others on thirteen (track 11 only having him talk over the beat) and does not contribute vocals on fifteen (Scarface is not on tracks 2, 3, 9, 10, 13, 14, 15, 16, 17, 19, 21, 25, 27, 28, 30). A sequel to the album, My Homies Part 2, was released on March 7, 2006.

Along with singles, music videos were produced for the songs: "Homies & Thuggs", featuring 2Pac and Master P and "Sex Faces", featuring Too Short, Tela and Devin the Dude. In the original of "Homies & Thuggs", 2Pac's verse was later added. The song, "Sleepin' In My Nikes", was originally released on the Seagram album, Souls on Ice. The solo track, "Boo Boo'n", was later re-released on the Devin the Dude album, The Dude.

Track listing

Charts

Weekly charts

Year-end charts

Certifications

See also
List of number-one R&B albums of 1998 (U.S.)

References 

Scarface (rapper) albums
1998 albums
Rap-A-Lot Records albums
Albums produced by N.O. Joe
Albums produced by Mike Dean (record producer)